The American Catalog Mailers Association (ACMA) is an industry association which advocates specifically for catalog marketers. It is a nonprofit organization organized under Section 501(c)(6), headquartered in Washington, D.C.

Issues
As the primary voice for catalogers, ACMA represents the short and long term collective interests of its members. These include:

Postal rates, regulations and technical matters
Environmental issues
Privacy issues 
Remote sales tax collection
Regulatory and congressional relations
Innovative business oriented advances or external threats

As needed, the ACMA works with other organizations and associations when its interests align with those of others in related industries.

Membership 

Membership is open to any party with significant interests in the catalog mailing industry. These include:

1) Multi-channel retailers for whom catalogs represents a significant sales channel, whether the demand is fulfilled via traditional mail order techniques, over the internet or by generating traffic into brick and mortar retail stores.

2) Suppliers and service providers to multi-channel retailers including printers, paper mills and brokers, list providers, cooperative databases, modeling providers, creative agencies, consultants, among others.

History 

The ACMA was formed in 2007, following a massive postal rate hike on catalog mail, which many catalog mailers believed occurred because there was no proper representation of their interests in the political process. Since its inception, the ACMA has had impact in two postal rate setting processes, testified before Congress and regulatory bodies, and established relationships with the United States Postal Service, the Postal Regulatory Commission, and members of the House of Representative and the Senate and Congressional staff.

ACMA expertise 

The American Catalog Mailers Association has been called on to testify before Congress on the impact of pending legislation on several occasions.  The media looks to the association for an understanding of how various postal changes may affect the marketplace.

Leadership 

Hamilton Davison serves as the association's president & executive director; Paul Miller is VP & deputy director; Cathy Roden is assistant director. The officers of the organization include:

Chairman - Brad Darooge, Baudville Inc.
Immediate Past Chairman - Martin McClanan, GiftTree
VP-Secretary - Jim Feinson, Gardeners Supply
Treasurer, Dave Johnson, Orchard Brands
VP-Membership, Jeff Kelly, Infogroup Media Solutions
VP-Membership, Chris Pickering, MeritDirect

Additional members of the board of directors:
Allen Abbott, CohereOne
Terri Alpert, Stony Creek Brands
John Coyle, RR Donnelley
Larry Davis, Ross-Simons/Luxury Brands
Scott Drayer, Paul Fredrick MenStyle
Jonathan Fleishmann, Potpourri Group
Bill Garbose, Harriet Carter Gifts
Louis Geisler, AmeriMark Direct
Bob Goldsmith, Oriental Trading Company
John Haydock, Plow and Hearth
Pat Henderson, Quad/Graphics
Doug Hershey, New Pig Corporation
Rick Kropski, Arandell Corporation
Chris Paradysz, Paradysz + PM Digital
Bob Runke, Barco Products
Neil Sexton, Northern Safety
Steven Singer, Taylor Corporation
Mark Taxel, I.C.E. Marketing
Geoff Wolf, J Schmid Assoc.

References

External links
ACMA website

Trade associations based in the United States